The Basilica of Santa Maria at Pie' di Chienti was a former Roman Catholic monastery and church located in a rural site on the north bank of the Chienti river, just outside of the town of Montecosaro Scalo, in the province of Macerata, region of Marche, Italy. The church is also known as the Santissima Annunziata.

History
The monastery was founded in the 10th century, and remained under jurisdiction of the Abbey of Farfa until 1477. Documents cite the presence of an abbey by 936. The pope Sixtus IV transferred the property to the order of the Ospedale di Santa Maria della Pietà of Camerino.

The Romanesque stone church we see today was rebuilt in 1125 by the Lombard abbot Agenolfo or Adenolfo. An earthquake in that era caused the upper portions of the church to collapse. The church once had a lower crypt, above an elevated presbytery and three radial chapels emerging from the apse. The perimeter of the apse had an ambulatory that allowed lay visitors to walk without disturbing the cloistered monks in the central choir space. The interior has a basilica layout with a nave and two aisles. The church has undergone some refurbishments over the centuries. The interior still retains a 15th-century wooden crucifix and medieval frescoes.

References

10th-century churches in Italy
12th-century churches in Italy
Buildings and structures completed in 1125
Romanesque architecture in le Marche
Churches in the Province of Macerata
Roman Catholic churches in the Marche
Benedictine monasteries in Italy